Prince Amedeo of Belgium, Archduke of Austria-Este (Amedeo Marie Joseph Carl Pierre Philippe Paola Marcus d'Aviano; born 21 February 1986) is a grandson of King Albert II of Belgium, and thus a member of the Belgian royal family. He is also heir-apparent to the headship of the House of Austria-Este, a cadet branch of the House of Habsburg-Lorraine, and is sixth in line to the throne of Belgium.

Birth and family
Amedeo was born on 21 February 1986 at the Saint-Luc University Hospital in Woluwe-Saint-Lambert, Belgium, as the first child and elder son of Lorenz, Archduke of Austria-Este, and Princess Astrid of Belgium. He bears the same given name as his paternal great-grandfather, Prince Amedeo, Duke of Aosta. His godparents are his maternal uncle, King Philippe and grandmother, Queen Paola of Belgium.

Amedeo himself is godfather to his cousin, Princess Elisabeth, Duchess of Brabant. Amedeo has one younger brother, Joachim (b. 1991), and three younger sisters: Maria Laura (b. 1988), Luisa Maria (b. 1995) and Laetitia Maria (b. 2003).

He was baptised and married by the archbishop of Mechelen-Brussels, Cardinal Danneels.

Education and career
Amedeo undertook primary school and the greater part of his secondary education at the Jesuit school Sint-Jan Berchmanscollege (founded 1604) in Brussels, popular with Belgian aristocracy and royalty. He finished his secondary education at Sevenoaks School in Kent, England, between 2001 and 2004. He then spent a year in Belgium's Royal Military Academy. In September 2005, he began studies at the London School of Economics, where he graduated in 2008 with a BSc degree in Management, and took a sabbatical before entering professional life.

From July 2009 to June 2012, Amedeo worked for Deloitte in New York City, first as a business analyst from July 2009 to June 2011, then as a management consultant in strategy and operations from July 2011 to June 2012. He then worked as a research analyst intern at Accumulus Capital Management, LLC from August through December 2012.

During 2013 and 2014, Amedeo resumed his studies, obtaining an MBA degree at the Columbia Business School of Columbia University. He subsequently returned to Belgium, where he worked for McKinsey & Company in Brussels from September 2014 to September 2016. In January 2017, he began working at the Gutzwiller private bank in Basel, where his father is a partner.

Marriage 
On 15 February 2014, the Belgian Royal Court announced the engagement of Prince Amedeo to an Italian journalist, Elisabetta "Lili" Maria Rosboch von Wolkenstein, the only child of Italian film producer Nobile Ettore Rosboch von Wolkenstein (b. 1945) and his wife, Countess Anna Maria "Lilia" de Smecchia (b. 1947), also a film producer. Patrilineally, Elisabetta descends from the House of Caracciolo, as her father is a natural child of Prince Filippo Caracciolo di Castagneto and Baroness Elisabetta Jaworski von Wolkenstein (1915–1959), who at the time of his birth was the widow of Nobile Ettore Bernardo Rosboch (1893–1944).
 	
Amedeo and Elisabetta both descend from Don Giuseppe Tiberio Ruffo di Calabria-Santapau, 2nd Prince of Palazzolo, Count of Sinopoli (1627–1683), while through German princely dynasties their most recent common ancestor is Franz Albrecht I, Prince of Oettingen-Spielberg (1663–1737).

The couple's wedding was celebrated on 5 July 2014 in Rome's Basilica Santa Maria in Trastevere, in the presence of the royal family (with the exception of his great-aunt Queen Fabiola), as well as members of the cadet branches of the House of Habsburg-Lorraine, including the bridegroom's grandmother, Margherita of Savoy, Dowager Archduchess of Austria-Este, and members of other dynasties, including Princess Margaretha of Luxembourg and her husband Prince Nikolaus of Liechtenstein, Princess Beatrice of York and Jean-Christophe, Prince Napoléon. The couple were planning to relocate in Belgium after the wedding.

Amedeo and Elisabetta have two children:
 Archduchess Anna Astrid Marie of Austria-Este (born on 17 May 2016).
 Archduke Maximilian Joseph of Austria-Este (born on 6 September 2019).

Succession rights to the Belgian throne
In 1991, Amedeo obtained, along with his mother and younger siblings, succession rights to the Belgian throne. In 1993, his maternal grandfather acceded to the throne as King Albert II and he became third in Belgium's line of succession, following his uncle Prince Philippe, Duke of Brabant, and his mother. Upon Philippe's marriage in 1999, the prospect of Amedeo inheriting the throne substantially diminished, and the birth of a daughter and dynastic heir to Philippe in 2001 dropped his place in the order of succession down to fourth and eventually to seventh, following the birth of Philippe's other children. The abdication on 21 July 2013 of his grandfather King Albert II promoted him to sixth in line to the throne.

Although an announcement of Amedeo's engagement was published on the Royal Family's website, no dynastic authorisation for his marriage was published prior to his wedding, as foreseen in Article 85 of the Belgian Constitution. Speculation in the media included a commentator on the military parade for La Une who, on 21 July 2014 (Belgian National Day), alleged that no royal authorisation was announced because the prince intentionally chose not to request permission to marry, and therefore Amedeo was no longer deemed in the line of succession. In November 2015, a royal decree expressing King Philippe's retroactive permission for the marriage was gazetted in the Moniteur Belge, without the consultation of the legislative chambers and in contravention of the Article 85 of the Belgian Constitution.

Titles and styles
All the children of Princess Astrid and Archduke Lorenz bear the title of "Prince(ss) of Belgium" by Belgian Royal Decree of 2 December 1991, which is distinct from their traditional Austro-Hungarian titles.

Military ranks
   2004–2005 Royal Military Academy (Social & Military Sciences)
 2005 Para-commando Training: Parachutist Badge
  September 2005 September 2007: Belgian Land Component, Warrant-Officer as Candidate-officer (Adjudant Candidat-Officier), after his formation at Royal Military Academy
  September 2007: Belgian Land Component, Second lieutenant (as a Reserve officer) of the Regiment Carabiniers Prins Boudewijn – Grenadiers

External links

References

Austria-Este
Belgian people of Austrian descent
1986 births
Living people
People educated at Sevenoaks School
Alumni of the London School of Economics
Royal Military Academy (Belgium) alumni
Columbia Business School alumni
Belgian Army officers
Deloitte people
Austrian princes
Belgian Roman Catholics